The Railway Police (or Government Railway Police) is a specialized unit of Bangladesh Police responsible for the security of rail properties and investigation of crimes committed on Bangladesh Railway properties.

History
Railway Police has two ranges, Chittagong Railway Police and Saidpur Railway Police. The force is led by a Deputy Inspector General of Bangladesh Police. The Railway Police, as of 2013, had 1600 personnel. In 2014, the Government of Bangladesh announced plans to expand the railway force. On 11 July 2016, a 65 year old veteran of Bangladesh Liberation war was beaten to death by members of Railway Police in Jamalpur Railway Police Station.

In 2019, the Officer in Charge of Khulna Railway Police Station and other officers were accused of raping a woman and arresting her on false allegation. The court of the chief judicial magistrate sent an order to the Superintendent of Railway police in August 2019. Pakshey Railway Police and Railway Police headquarters opened two separate investigation on the allegation. The victim filed a case against five police officers including the Officer-in-Charge, Osman Goni, with the Women and Children Repression Prevention Tribunal-3 on 24 September 2019. The court directed the Police Bureau of Investigation to investigate the case.

References

Organisations based in Dhaka
Government agencies of Bangladesh
Railroad police agencies
Bangladesh Police
Bangladesh Railway
Law enforcement agencies of Bangladesh
Police units of Bangladesh